Enterprise is an unincorporated community in Catahoula Parish, Louisiana, United States. Enterprise had a post office until it closed on October 15, 2011. It still has its own ZIP code, 71425

References

Unincorporated communities in Catahoula Parish, Louisiana
Unincorporated communities in Louisiana